Harold Langford Leathers (December 2, 1898 – April 12, 1977) was a professional baseball middle infielder who played in nine games for the 1920 Chicago Cubs of Major League Baseball (MLB).

Biography
Leathers' minor league baseball career spanned 1918 to 1924, plus a final season in 1926. He appeared in 778 minor league games, compiling a .253 batting average. Defensively, he played 480 games as a shortstop and 142 games as a second baseman.

From mid-September to early October 1920, Leathers appeared in nine major league games with the Chicago Cubs. He registered a .304 batting average (7-for-23) with one home run, which was hit off of Joe Oeschger of the Boston Braves. Defensively, Leathers made six appearances at shortstop (four starts) and three appearances at second base, recording an .837 fielding percentage. He committed three errors in his first major league start at shortstop, one of which led to an unearned run, the difference in a 1–0 Cubs loss to the Brooklyn Robins.

Leathers was born in 1898 in Selma, California. As of February 1942, he was living in Los Angeles and was self-employed as a gardener. He died in 1977 in Modesto, California, and was interred in Hughson, California.

Notes

References

External links

1898 births
1977 deaths
People from Selma, California
Baseball players from California
Chicago Cubs players
Los Angeles Angels (minor league) players
Seattle Giants players
Norfolk Mary Janes players
Kansas City Blues players
Mobile Bears players
Pittsfield Hillies players
Charleston Pals players
Macon Peaches players
Wilson Bugs players
Bloomington Bloomers players